Svetlana Radkevich (born 9 October 1979) is a Belarusian speed skater. She competed at the 2002, 2006 and the 2010 Winter Olympics.

References

1979 births
Living people
Belarusian female speed skaters
Olympic speed skaters of Belarus
Speed skaters at the 2002 Winter Olympics
Speed skaters at the 2006 Winter Olympics
Speed skaters at the 2010 Winter Olympics
Sportspeople from Minsk